The Women's singles luge competition at the 1964 Winter Olympics in Innsbruck was held from 30 January to 4 February, at Olympic Sliding Centre Innsbruck.

Results

References

Luge at the 1964 Winter Olympics
1964 in women's sport